The 1998 West Devon Borough Council election took place on 6 May 1999 to elect members of West Devon Borough Council in England. The whole council was up for election and the council stayed under no overall control.

Election result

References

1999 English local elections
1999
1990s in Devon